Howard Berk (c. 1925 - March 27, 2016) was an American novelist, screenwriter, and producer.

Early life
Berk was born circa 1925. He graduated from the University of Georgia.

Career
Berk worked as a reporter for The Havana Herald in Cuba in the 1950s. He also worked for the Associated Press. He taught at his alma mater, the University of Georgia, and he authored four novels.

Berk wrote several episodes of television series Columbo, Mission: Impossible, and McMillan & Wife. He also wrote films including the 1985 movie Target, starring Gene Hackman and directed by Arthur Penn.

Death
Berk died on March 27, 2016, in Los Angeles, California.

References

External links

1920s births
2016 deaths
University of Georgia alumni
American screenwriters
University of Georgia faculty
American male novelists